Hiram Richard Lott (April 4, 1829 – June 2, 1895) was a Louisiana politician who served as a State Senator and later became Lieutenant Governor. He had an interest in a Nicaragua Canal and became consul to Nicaragua. He died in Managua.

He represented Madison Parish and West Carroll Parish.

References 

1829 births
1895 deaths
People from Covington County, Mississippi
Lieutenant Governors of Louisiana
Democratic Party Louisiana state senators
19th-century American politicians